Edward Herbert (1907–1949) was an American criminal active in the 1940s.

Early life 
Edward Herbert was born on December 1, 1907, in New York City, New York. Not much else is known about Herbert's early life except that his father's name was Herbert and that he was most likely a mobster working for Jewish mob boss Benjamin "Bugsy" Siegel (due to the fact that he moved to Los Angeles at the same time Siegel did).

Los Angeles 

When his boss, Benjamin Siegel, moved out to Los Angeles, California, Herbert did the same. When he moved to L.A., he worked as an enforcer for the Siegel-Cohen crime family. On June 20, 1947, Siegel was murdered by an apparent East Coast Mafia hitman with a .30 Caliber military M1 Carbine.

When Siegel was murdered, his right-hand man, Mickey Cohen became the boss of his criminal empire spanning from L.A. to Burbank to Las Vegas. Along with Harry "Hooky" Rothman, Nerbert was a top lieutenant of Cohen's. However, one of Siegel's lieutenants and Cohen's rival, Jack Dragna, didn't sit well with his rise as boss and decided to rage a full-scale war on Cohen.

Battle of Sunset Strip 
Dragna and Cohen's war was nicknamed the "Battle of Sunset Strip". Dragna soon began to eliminate Cohen's lieutenants, one-by-one; he ordered the deaths of: Harold Rothman, Frank Niccoli, Anthony Brancato, and several others.

Death and aftermath 
At 3:55 a.m. on July 20, 1949, Dragna made another move on Cohen, but this time with civilians in the mix. A failed shooting attempt was made with several people injured: reporter Florabel Muir, Dee David (an actress), Cohen, Harry Cooper (a bodyguard assigned to Cohen by Frederick N. Howser), and Herbert was injured.

But, later, Herbert died of his wounds that same day and was buried in New York.

Media 
 Evan Jones portrayed Herbert in the 2013 film Gangster Squad.

References 

Gangsters from New York City
1907 births
1949 deaths
Murdered American gangsters
Deaths by firearm in California